Acacia pravissima, commonly known as Ovens wattle, Oven wattle, wedge-leaved wattle and Tumut wattle, is a species of flowering plant in the legume family Fabaceae. It is an evergreen shrub native to Victoria, the South West Slopes and Southern Tablelands of New South Wales, Australia.

Description
The ribbed branchlets can be either glabrous or hairy. Like most species of Acacia it has phyllodes rather than true leaves. The grey-green coloured and crowded, on short stem-projections. It produces racemes of ball-shaped yellow flowers in winter and spring. The prolific inflorescences have spherical flower-heads with a diameter of  containing 8 to 12 golden coloured flowers.

Taxonomy
The species was first formally described in 1853 by the botanist Ferdinand von Mueller as a part of the work First general report of the Government Botanist on the vegetation of the colony. Victoria as published in the Votes and Proceedings of the Legislative Assembly of the Victorian Parliament. It was reclassified as Racosperma pravissimum by Leslie Pedley in 2006 then returned to genus Acacia in 2006.
The Latin specific epithet pravissima means "very crooked".

Distribution
In is endemic to south-eastern Australia in the more elevated areas of the Great Dividing Range from around Tumut in New South Wales in the north through the Cotter Range and Australian Capital Territory down to around the Strathbogie Range and Macalister River in Victoria. It is often situated damp sheltered sites and along creeks and streams usually as a part of Eucalyptus forest and woodland communities.

Use in horticulture
Ovens wattle is hardy and easy to grow. It can be propagated from scarified seed and grows in most soils, in full sun or part shade, preferring well-drained soil.

Gallery

See also
List of Acacia species

References

R Lancaster, (1998). Plants That Should Be Better Known: Acacia pravissima, Royal Horticultural Society..

External links
 

pravissima
Flora of New South Wales
Flora of Victoria (Australia)
Taxa named by Ferdinand von Mueller
Plants described in 1853